Aleksey Vladimirovich Yegorov (born March 21, 1975) is a retired male freestyle swimmer. He competed in two consecutive Summer Olympics, starting in 1996 (Atlanta, Georgia) for Kazakhstan and then for Russia in 2000 (Sydney, Australia). His best Olympic result was finishing in 8th place at the 2000 Summer Olympics in the men's 4×200 m freestyle relay event.

References

External links
 

1975 births
Living people
People from Temirtau
Russian male freestyle swimmers
Kazakhstani male freestyle swimmers
Olympic swimmers of Kazakhstan
Olympic swimmers of Russia
Swimmers at the 1996 Summer Olympics
Swimmers at the 2000 Summer Olympics
Asian Games medalists in swimming
Asian Games silver medalists for Kazakhstan
Asian Games bronze medalists for Kazakhstan
Swimmers at the 1994 Asian Games
Medalists at the 1994 Asian Games
Kazakhstani people of Russian descent